HDMS Agdlek [Ash-laerc] (: "long-tailed duck") was the lead ship of the  of arctic patrol cutter in the Royal Danish Navy. Agdlek was commissioned in March 1974 and decommissioned in April 2008 after 34 years of service.

Sources

Agdlek-class cutters
Ships built in Svendborg
1973 ships